Elizabeth Lewis may refer to:

 Betty Washington Lewis (1733–1797), only sister of George Washington to live to adulthood
 Betty Bagby Lewis (1925–2008), American writer and local historian
 Elizabeth Foreman Lewis (1892–1958), American children's book author